Richard Ditto is a former member of the Ohio Senate, serving from 1979 to 1980. He represented the 12th District which encompassed much of West-Central Ohio.  He also worked as a representative for Congressman Mike Oxley for many years.

References

1930s births
Republican Party Ohio state senators
Living people